Rahmoc Enterprises is a former NASCAR Winston Cup team that operated from 1978 to 1993. The team was owned by long-time engine builder Bob Rahilly and Butch Mock. Butch Mock and Bob Rahilly split in 1992, with the race team becoming Butch Mock Motorsports in 1993.
Rahmoc Enterprises is still operating today, with Dick and Bob Rahilly still turning the wrenches, as an engine builder and supplier for many NASCAR teams. They also build racecars and manage several smaller race teams.

Beginnings 
Rahmoc's debut in NASCAR came in 1978 competing in two events, at the NAPA National 500. Mock drove the No. 75 Chevrolet to a 26th-place finish. He also ran the Dixie 500 at Atlanta, finishing 24th. Mock ran the 1979 Daytona 500 the next year, but finished 35th when he was involved in a wreck not of his making early in the race. After the Daytona wreck, Mock ceased driving and Rahmoc had several different drivers. Some were Lennie Pond at Atlanta and Daytona, Bobby Brack at Charlotte, and Bill Elswick for numerous races, his best finish being 16th at Richmond. Harry Gant drove in 1980 for the team at Riverside International Raceway, finishing seventh and Texas world Speedway, finishing eighth. Elswick returned over the next eleven races, and the team also picked up sponsorship from his Performer Boats Company. John Anderson, Chuck Bown, Joe Millikan, and Elswick finished out the year. Millikan came back in 1981, but was replaced after the Gabriel 400 by Tim Richmond. Richmond got his first top 10 finish in that event at Nashville Fairgrounds Speedway. Gary Balough drove for the rest of the 1981 season.

Balough returned in 1982, posting a top-ten at the Coca-Cola 500, but was released after his legal issues just five races into the season. Joe Ruttman took over for the rest of the season, Except for the Riverside Event, posting four top-fives, and numerous top tens. Jimmy Insolo filled in for the team at Riverside.

1983–1992 
In 1983, Rahmoc signed a one-year driver/sponsor agreement for Neil Bonnett to drive their first time for the team, full-time sponsored Hodgdon Chevy. Bonnett picked up wins in the Busch Clash and the UNO 125 at Daytona, the World 600 at Charlotte and the Atlanta Journal 500. He finished sixth in points that year. For the 1984 season, and again without any sponsorship, long-time independent Dave Marcis was named driver, and had nine top-tens and a thirteenth place in points. Lake Speed took over in 1985, finishing second in The Daytona 500 in his first start with the team. This result brought full-time sponsor Nationwize Auto Parts to them and they finished 10th in the points. Speed had two tenth-place finishes in 1986, but was released after four races by the sponsor. Jody Ridley stepped in as an interim driver and had one top-ten before moving on after 10 races. Jim Sauter had four starts, before Morgan Shepherd took over for the balance of the season, posting two top-tens.

In 1987, Bonnett returned with Valvoline as the sponsor of Rahmoc's Pontiacs. Bonnett had fifteen top-tens and was on his way to a top-ten points run, when he broke his hip in a crash at the Oakwood Homes 500. Morgan Shepard returned to the team to finish the season for the team, nearly winning the Rockingham Event.

Bonnett returned in 1988, finished 4th in the Daytona 500 and won at Richmond and Rockingham and at a special race at Calder Park in Australia in early 1988 with the team returning at the end of 1988 with Bob Rahilly,two Pontiacs,a limited regular professional race crew remaining crew being filled by local Australians preparing and qualifying both cars including performing the pit crews duties some for the first time on race day for the Calder Park Thunderdome Christmas 500 with another strong performance qualifying pole position then dominated the race day running one and two with Neil Bonnet in #57 sustaining damage after being pushed into the wall on turn two in the final laps causing him to drop a few places. Morgan Sheppard continued on in a dominate performance coming home in first in #75 with it claiming victory Lane for Rahmoc Racing with back to back wins Down Under, all in the first four races of the season. But eventually, he began to have health issues, fell off the pace, missing several races. Due to Neil's health, sponsor Valvoline called for a new driver going into the 1989 season.

Shepherd, who had filled in for Bonnett twice in 1988, was named as the full-time driver in 1989 with Valvoline again as the sponsor, the final of their 3-year agreement with Rahmoc. He garnered one pole and thirteen top-tens. Valvoline indicated they would return as a sponsor in 1990 if a younger driver could be had. So for 1990, Rick Wilson joined the team, which switched to Oldsmobile and with a late partial limited sponsorship from Food Lion/Dinner Bell Foods since Valvoline had ultimately decided instead to sit out the 1990 season. Wilson struggled heavily in his tenure, and mutually agreed to split with the team at season end. In 1991, Joe Ruttman, and with full sponsorship from Dinner Bell joined Rahmoc for the second time in his career. He finished third in the Daytona 500 and had four top-ten finishes and finished 20th in points.

Without a sponsor for 1992, Dick Trickle drove the car for Rahmoc in the Daytona 500, finishing fifth. After that event, team co-owner Bob Rahilly elected to retire from Winston Cup Racing, and return to his roots as an engine builder/supplier. Mock went on to form his own new team, Butch Mock Motorsports.

Final years  
After the 1992 Daytona 500, Bob Rahilly and Butch Mock split, with Bob and Dick Rahilly continuing to build engines and race cars under the name RAHMOC Racing Engines. Butch Mock would take the assets of RahMoc and form Butch Mock Motorsports. The 75 would return in 1993, with Dick Trickle driving for most of the season, with Todd Bodine and Phil Parsons running the remaining schedule. Bodine would drive for the team through 1995. Morgan Shepherd would return to the 75 in 1996. Rick Mast would take over in 1997 and stay with the team through the 1998 season before being replaced by Ted Musgrave in 1999. Mock would eventually sell to Darwin Oordt, who would run the 75 under Galaxy Motorsports with Wally Dallenbach Jr. as the driver. Oordt's ownership was short-lived, and the 75 team shut down in 2001 after the team could not find sponsorship. 

Bob and Dick Rahilly still continue to build championship-winning race engines and race cars at the original Rahmoc facility on Flowes Store Road in Concord, NC .

Team Results
Results as Butch Mock Motorsports/Galaxy Motorsports

Car No. 75 results

Driver history
RahMoc Enterprises
Butch Mock (1978–79)
Bill Elswick (1979–81)
Bobby Brack (1979)
Harry Gant (1980)
Lennie Pond (1980)
John Anderson (1980)
Chuck Bown (1980)
Kyle Petty (1980)
Jim Sauter (1980, 1986)
Joe Millikan (1980–81)
Dick May (1981)
Tim Richmond (1981)
Gary Balough (1981–82)
Joe Ruttman (1982, 1987, 1991)
Jimmy Insolo (1982)
Neil Bonnett (1983, 1987–88)
Dave Marcis (1984)
Lake Speed (1985–86)
Jody Ridley (1986)
Morgan Shepherd (1986, 1988–89, 1996)
Rick Wilson (1990)
Dick Trickle (1992 Daytona 500, suspended operations; returned in 1993 with Butch Mock Motorsports)
Todd Bodine (1993-1995)
Rick Mast (1997-1998)
Ted Musgrave (1999)
Wally Dallenbach (2000, for Galaxy Motorsports)

References

External links 
RahMoc Enterprises Winston Cup Owner Statistics (1978–1992)

1978 establishments in the United Kingdom
American auto racing teams
Defunct NASCAR teams
2001 disestablishments in North Carolina